The 1880 New South Wales colonial election was for 108 members representing 72 electoral districts. The election was conducted on the basis of a simple majority or first-past-the-post voting system. In this election there were 29 multi-member districts returning 68 members and 43 single member districts. In the multi-member districts each elector could vote for as many candidates as there were vacancies. 14 districts were uncontested. There was no recognisable party structure at this election. The average number of enrolled voters per seat was 1,549 for a country seat and 2,361 for an urban one, ranging from East Maitland (966) to Bourke (3,478).

The electoral boundaries were established under the Electoral Act 1880 (NSW) which was the first major redistribution since 1858 in which 12 districts were abolished, and 23 new districts were created. an overall increase in the number of districts from 61 to 72, and an increase in the number of members from 73 to 108.

Election results

Albury

| colspan="2"   |  
	| colspan="2" style="text-align:center;" | (new seat)

George Day was the sitting member for The Hume

Argyle

| colspan="2"   |  
	| colspan="2" style="text-align:center;" | (1 new seat)

The sitting member William Davies did not contest the election.

Balmain

| colspan="2"   |  
	| colspan="2" style="text-align:center;" | (new seat)

The Sydney Daily Telegraph reported that 60 of the informal votes had written "I Vote for Taylor" on them, where Jacob Garrard won the election by only 12 votes.

Balranald

| colspan="2"   |  
	| colspan="2" style="text-align:center;" | (1 new seat)

The sitting member Colin Simson did not contest the election.

Bathurst

The Bogan

| colspan="2"   |  
	| colspan="2" style="text-align:center;" | (1 new seat)

The Bogan lost part of the district to the new seat of Forbes. The sitting member Walter Coonan unsuccessfully contested Forbes.

Boorowa

| colspan="2"   |  
	| colspan="2" style="text-align:center;" | (new seat)

Bourke

| colspan="2"   |  
	| colspan="2" style="text-align:center;" | (new seat)

Joseph Olliffe had already unsuccessfully contested [[Results of the 1880 New South Wales colonial election#East Sydney|East Sydney]].

Braidwood

Camden

The other siting member Arthur Onslow did not contest the election. Joseph Leary was the sitting member for [[Results of the 1880 New South Wales colonial election#The Murrumbidgee|The Murrumbidgee]].

Canterbury

One sitting member John Lucas did not contest the election. The other sitting member Sir Henry Parkes successfully contested [[Results of the 1880 New South Wales colonial election#East Sydney|East Sydney]].

Carcoar

| colspan="2"   |  
	| colspan="2" style="text-align:center;" | (1 new seat)

Ezekiel Baker was the sitting member for the abolished district of Goldfields South.

The Clarence

The Clarence lost part of the district to [[Results of the 1880 New South Wales colonial election#Grafton|Grafton]] and part to [[Results of the 1880 New South Wales colonial election#The Richmond|The Richmond]]. The sitting member Charles Fawcett successfully contested The Richmond.

Central Cumberland

Durham

| colspan="2"   |  
	| colspan="2" style="text-align:center;" | (new seat)

Durham replaced all of the abolished district of The Paterson and part of the abolished district of The Williams. Herbert Brown was the member for The Paterson and William Johnston was the member for The Williams.

East Macquarie

East Maitland

The sitting member Henry Badgery successfully contested [[Results of the 1880 New South Wales colonial election#Monaro|Monaro]].

East Sydney

Of the sitting members, James Greenwood and John Macintosh did not contest the election and John Davies successfully contested [[Results of the 1880 New South Wales colonial election#South Sydney|South Sydney]]. Sir Henry Parkes was a sitting member for [[Results of the 1880 New South Wales colonial election#Canterbury|Canterbury]].

Eden

| colspan="2"   |  
	| colspan="2" style="text-align:center;" | (1 new seat)

Forbes

| colspan="2"   |  
	| colspan="2" style="text-align:center;" | (new seat)

Forbes replaced part of [[Results of the 1880 New South Wales colonial election#The Bogan|The Bogan]]. Walter Coonan was the sitting member for The Bogan.

The Glebe

Glen Innes

| colspan="2"   |  
	| colspan="2" style="text-align:center;" | (new seat)

Glen Innes was created from the northern part of [[Results of the 1880 New South Wales colonial election#New England|New England]].

Gloucester

| colspan="2"   |  
	| colspan="2" style="text-align:center;" | (new seat)

Archibald Jacob was the member for the abolished district of The Lower Hunter.

Goulburn

Grafton

| colspan="2"   |  
	| colspan="2" style="text-align:center;" | (new seat)

Grafton was created from part of [[Results of the 1880 New South Wales colonial election#The Clarence|The Clarence]].

Grenfell

| colspan="2"   |  
	| colspan="2" style="text-align:center;" | (new seat)

Grenfell partly replaced the abolished district of The Lachlan.

Gundagai

| colspan="2"   |  
	| colspan="2" style="text-align:center;" | (new seat)

Gundagai partly replaced the abolished district of The Lachlan.

Gunnedah

| colspan="2"   |  
	| colspan="2" style="text-align:center;" | (new seat)

The Gwydir

The sitting member Thomas Dangar successfully contested [[Results of the 1880 New South Wales colonial election#The Namoi|The Namoi]].

Hartley

The Hastings and Manning

| colspan="2"   |  
	| colspan="2" style="text-align:center;" | (new seat)

Replaced the abolished district of The Hastings. The sitting member Robert Smith successfully contested [[Results of the 1880 New South Wales colonial election#The Macleay|The Macleay]].

The Hawkesbury

| colspan="2"   |  
	| colspan="2" style="text-align:center;" | (1 less seat)

The other sitting member Henry Moses did not contest the election. Henry McQuade was the sitting member for the abolished district of Windsor.

The Hume

| colspan="2"   |  
	| colspan="2" style="text-align:center;" | (1 new seat)

The sitting member George Day successfully contested Albury

The Hunter

Illawarra

Inverell

| colspan="2"   |  
	| colspan="2" style="text-align:center;" | (new seat)

Kiama

The Macleay

| colspan="2"   |  
	| colspan="2" style="text-align:center;" | (new seat)

Robert Smith was the member for the abolished district of The Hastings.

Molong

| colspan="2"   |  
	| colspan="2" style="text-align:center;" | (new seat)

Monaro

| colspan="2"   |  
	| colspan="2" style="text-align:center;" | (1 new seat)

The sitting member John Murphy did not contest the election. Henry Badgery was the member for [[Results of the 1880 New South Wales colonial election#East Maitland|East Maitland]].

Morpeth

Mudgee

| colspan="2"   |  
	| colspan="2" style="text-align:center;" | (2 new seats)

The sitting member David Buchanan had already unsuccessfully contested [[Results of the 1880 New South Wales colonial election#West Sydney|West Sydney]]. Samuel Terry was the member for [[Results of the 1880 New South Wales colonial election#New England|New England]] and Louis Beyers was the member for the abolished district of Goldfields West.

The Murray

| colspan="2"   |  
	| colspan="2" style="text-align:center;" | (1 new seat)

The Murrumbidgee

| colspan="2"   |  
	| colspan="2" style="text-align:center;" | (1 new seat)

The sitting member Joseph Leary unsuccessfully contested [[Results of the 1880 New South Wales colonial election#Camden|Camden]].

The Namoi

| colspan="2"   |  
	| colspan="2" style="text-align:center;" | (new seat)

Thomas Dangar was the sitting member for [[Results of the 1880 New South Wales colonial election#The Gwydir|The Gwydir]].

The Nepean

New England

| colspan="2"   |  
	| colspan="2" style="text-align:center;" | (1 new seat)

The sitting member Samuel Terry successfully contested [[Results of the 1880 New South Wales colonial election#Mudgee|Mudgee]]. Henry Copeland was the member for the abolished seat of Goldfields North.

Newcastle

| colspan="2"   |  
	| colspan="2" style="text-align:center;" | (1 new seat)

Newtown

| colspan="2"   |  
	| colspan="2" style="text-align:center;" | (1 new seat)

Northumberland

| colspan="2"   |  
	| colspan="2" style="text-align:center;" | (1 new seat)

Orange

| colspan="2"   |  
	| colspan="2" style="text-align:center;" | (1 new seat)

Paddington

| colspan="2"   |  
	| colspan="2" style="text-align:center;" | (1 new seat)

Parramatta

| colspan="2"   |  
	| colspan="2" style="text-align:center;" | (1 less seat)

The other siting member William Long did not contest the election.

Patrick's Plains

Queanbeyan

Redfern

| colspan="2"   |  
	| colspan="2" style="text-align:center;" | (new seat)

The Richmond

| colspan="2"   |  
	| colspan="2" style="text-align:center;" | (new seat)

The Richmond was created from the northern part of [[Results of the 1880 New South Wales colonial election#The Clarence|The Clarence]] and Charles Fawcett was the member for The Clarence.

Shoalhaven

South Sydney

| colspan="2"   |  
	| colspan="2" style="text-align:center;" | (new seat)

John Davies was a sitting member for [[Results of the 1880 New South Wales colonial election#East Sydney|East Sydney]].

St Leonards

Tamworth

| colspan="2"   |  
	| colspan="2" style="text-align:center;" | (new seat)

Hanley Bennett was the member for the abolished district of Liverpool Plains.

Tenterfield

Tumut

| colspan="2"   |  
	| colspan="2" style="text-align:center;" | (new seat)

The Upper Hunter

| colspan="2"   |  
	| colspan="2" style="text-align:center;" | (1 new seat)

Wellington

The sitting member John Shepherd did not contest the election. Edmund Barton was the member for the abolished district of University of Sydney.

Wentworth

| colspan="2"   |  
	| colspan="2" style="text-align:center;" | (new seat)

West Macquarie

West Maitland

West Sydney

The other sitting member James Merriman did not contest the election. David Buchanan was the sitting member for [[Results of the 1880 New South Wales colonial election#Mudgee|Mudgee]] and subsequently regained a seat in that district.

Wollombi

Yass Plains

Young

| colspan="2"   |  
	| colspan="2" style="text-align:center;" | (new seat)

See also 

 Candidates of the 1880 New South Wales colonial election
 Members of the New South Wales Legislative Assembly, 1880–1882

Notes

References 

1880